James McAdam (30 March 1860 – 16 October 1911) was a Scottish footballer who played as a right winger.

Career
McAdam played club football for Third Lanark, and made one appearance for Scotland in 1880. A schoolmaster by profession, he worked on the Isle of Cumbrae and played for local teams, and later emigrated to the United States.

References

1860 births
1911 deaths
People from Thornliebank
Scottish footballers
Scotland international footballers
Third Lanark A.C. players
Association football outside forwards
Sportspeople from East Renfrewshire
Scottish emigrants to the United States